Sugar Camp may refer to the following places:

Sugar Camp, West Virginia, an unincorporated community in Doddridge County
Sugar Camp, Wisconsin, a town in Oneida County
Sugar Camp (community), Wisconsin, an unincorporated community in Oneida County
Sugar Camp Lake, a lake in Oneida County, Wisconsin